Matic is a common Slovene given name.

It may refer to:

 Matic Črnic, Slovenian footballer
 Matic Fink, Slovenian footballer
 Matic Kotnik, Slovenian footballer
 Matic Maruško, Slovenian footballer
 Matic Osovnikar, Slovenian sprinter
 Matic Paljk, Slovenian footballer
 Matic Podlipnik, Slovenian hockey player
 Matic Rebec, Slovenian basketball player
 Matic Reja, Slovenian footballer
 Matic Seferović, Slovenian footballer
 Matic Sirnik, Slovenian basketball player
 Matic Skube, Slovenian alpine skier 
 Matic Suholežnik, Slovenian handball player
 Matic Šušteršič, Slovenian sprinter
 Matic Verdinek, Slovenian handball player
 Matic Žitko, Slovenian footballer

Slovene masculine given names